The Southwest Louisiana National Wildlife Refuge Complex is a National Wildlife Refuge complex in the state of Louisiana. The refuge has more than 184,000 acres of land in four National Wildlife Refuges in southwest Louisiana.

Refuges within the complex

The Southwest Louisiana National Wildlife Refuge Complex consists of four federal wildlife refuges in southwest Louisiana:  Cameron Prairie National Wildlife Refuge, Sabine National Wildlife Refuge,  Lacassine National Wildlife Refuge, and  Shell Keys National Wildlife Refuge. These national wildlife refuges were created to provide support and protection as well as to provide winter habitat for migratory waterfowl.

See also
 East Cove National Wildlife Refuge

References

National Wildlife Refuges in Louisiana